Charles Gregory Davis, known as Greg Davis (born February 22, 1966) is the former mayor of Southaven in northern Mississippi, the state's fourth largest city, from 1997 to 2013. Prior to serving as mayor, he represented the 7th district in the Mississippi House of Representatives. He was the Republican Party's nominee for Mississippi's 1st congressional district in the 2008 special and general elections.

In 2012, he was convicted on charges of embezzlement, false pretense, and making fraudulent statements and was later sentenced, however his conviction was overturned in a 2017 retrial and found not guilty. Greg attended Mitchell Hamline School of Law where he received his Juris Doctor degree in December 2021.  After passing the Mississippi Bar in February 2022, he was admitted to practice law in July 2022.  He currently has a practice (Davis Law MS, PLLC) located in Hernando, MS.

Life and career 
Davis was born in Memphis, Tennessee. He graduated from Mississippi State University at Starkville with a degree in Civil Engineering. Upon graduation, he began a career in engineering and consulting.

From 1991 to 1997, Davis served in the Mississippi House of Representatives with assignments to the Appropriations and  Public Health committees. He was elected mayor of Southaven in 1997 and won a fourth term in 2009. On June 4, 2013, Davis lost his bid for a fifth term as mayor of Southaven and was succeeded by Darren Musselwhite, effective June 28, 2013.

Congressional elections, 2008 
In 2008, he began a campaign to fill the seat of U.S. Representative Roger Wicker, who had been appointed to the United States Senate following the resignation of Trent Lott. The initial primary was a three-candidate race which resulted in a primary runoff between Davis and former mayor Glenn McCullough of Tupelo. Davis won the runoff and thus became the Republican candidate in the special election.

In the initial special election on April 22 for Mississippi's 1st congressional district, Davis paced second to Democrat Travis Childers, but no candidate received a majority of the vote required to win the seat outright. Childers and Davis then faced each other in a May 13 runoff. Childers defeated Davis, 53.7 to 46.3 percent.

Childers filled the seat until the general election held on November 4, 2008, corresponding with the Obama-McCain presidential contest. As the Republican nominee once more, Davis again faced Childers and again lost, 54 to 44 percent.

Expense abuse investigation 
In December 2012, Davis was indicted on state charges of embezzlement, false pretense and making fraudulent statements. He was arrested and released on $3,500 bail. He was  convicted and sentenced in July 2014 to serve 2 1/2 years in state prison and pay more than $17,000 to the city. In a 2017 retrial, Davis was found not guilty of all charges, overturning his previous conviction.

Personal life 
Following an investigation by state auditors into questionable reimbursements, which included a purchase at Priape, a Toronto shop specializing in gay-interest merchandise, on December 15, 2011, Davis publicly acknowledged that he is gay, stating:

See also 
 Mississippi's 1st congressional district
 Mississippi's 1st congressional district special election, 2008
 United States House of Representatives elections in Mississippi, 2008#District 1

References 

1966 births
Living people
American politicians convicted of fraud
Gay politicians
LGBT Baptists
LGBT mayors of places in the United States
LGBT state legislators in Mississippi
LGBT people from Tennessee
Mayors of places in Mississippi
Republican Party members of the Mississippi House of Representatives
Mississippi politicians convicted of crimes
Mississippi State University alumni
People from Southaven, Mississippi
Politicians from Memphis, Tennessee
Southern Baptists
Baptists from Tennessee
Baptists from Mississippi
Candidates in the 2008 United States elections
20th-century American politicians
21st-century American politicians